The Keystone Giants football team represents Keystone College in college football at the NCAA Division III level. The Giants are members of the Landmark Conference, fielding its team in the Landmark Conference since 2023. The Giants play their home games at the Turf Field Complex in La Plume, Pennsylvania.

Their head coach is Justin Higgins, who took over the position in 2021.

Conference affiliations
 Independent (1936–1945, 1947–1948)
 Club team (2019)
 Eastern Collegiate Football Conference (2021–2022)
 Landmark Conference (2023–present)

List of head coaches

Key

Coaches

Year-by-year results

Notes

References

External links
 

 
American football teams established in 2021
2021 establishments in Pennsylvania